Seodongtan Station is a station on Line 1 of the Seoul Metropolitan Subway. It serves the cities of Hwaseong and Osan in Gyeonggi-do, South Korea.  The station takes its name (literally West Dongtan) from its local area of the city of Hwaseong, but straddles the border with Osan, in which it is mostly located and its postal address lies.

History
Seodongtan Station was opened on February 26, 2010, beside Byeongjeom Depot. It primarily serves residents who reside in Dongtan New Town.

By 2021 Seodongtan Station would be an interchange station with the future Indeogwon–Dongtan Line.

Station layout

References

Seoul Metropolitan Subway stations
Metro stations in Osan
Railway stations opened in 2010